The 2021 Pinty's Truck Race on Dirt was the 5th stock car race of the 2021 NASCAR Camping World Truck Series, and the inaugural running of the event. The race was held on Monday, March 29, 2021 in Bristol, Tennessee at a dirt version of Bristol Motor Speedway. The race was originally supposed to be run on Saturday, March 27, 2021 but due to torrential downpour over Saturday and Sunday, the race was delayed to Monday. The race would take 150 laps to complete. Martin Truex Jr., running a one-off race for Kyle Busch Motorsports, would win the race, marking his first career win in the Truck Series. Ben Rhodes of ThorSport Racing and Raphaël Lessard of GMS Racing would score the rest of the podium positions, scoring 2nd and 3rd, respectively.

Background 
Bristol Motor Speedway, formerly known as Bristol International Raceway and Bristol Raceway, is a NASCAR short track venue located in Bristol, Tennessee. Constructed in 1960, it held its first NASCAR race on July 30, 1961. Despite its short length, Bristol is among the most popular tracks on the NASCAR schedule because of its distinct features, which include extraordinarily steep banking, an all concrete surface, two pit roads, and stadium-like seating.

In 2021, the race shifted to a dirt surface version of the track and was renamed the Pinty's Truck Race on Dirt. On January 25, 2021, NASCAR announced the stage lengths of all events in all three series. According to the stage lengths, it states the race will consist of 150 laps.

Entry list 

*Withdrew due to a crash in practice on Friday.

Practice

1st practice 
The 1st practice took place on Friday, March 20 at 3:58 EST.

Many drivers would suffer incidents during the practice, with 11 spins counted.

Final practice 
Final practice took place on Friday, March 21, at 6:28 PM EST for 50 minutes.

J. R. Heffner would suffer a major crash, leading him to be towed. The 3 team would eventually withdraw from the race.

Starting lineup 
Originally, qualifying was scheduled to take place on Saturday, March 21. Qualifying was delayed, but eventually there was a break in the weather, and the first heat was started- but with overcast skies and a high chance of rain. Within a couple of laps, it started to rain, and every car in the heat except Mike Marlar (who started at the pole) had their windshields and grills covered by mud. The heat was stopped and eventually canceled. As a result, the lineup was set by owner's points- which meant John Hunter Nemechek of Kyle Busch Motorsports won the pole.

Race results 
Stage 1 Laps: 40

Stage 2 Laps: 50

Stage 3 Laps: 60

References 

2021 NASCAR Camping World Truck Series
NASCAR races at Bristol Motor Speedway
Pinty's Truck Race on Dirt
Pinty's Truck Race on Dirt